McCauley is an unincorporated community in Hardy County, West Virginia, United States. McCauley is located on the Lost River along West Virginia Route 55 shortly before the river "sinks" into an underground channel and reappears as the Cacapon River.

References

Unincorporated communities in Hardy County, West Virginia
Unincorporated communities in West Virginia